Dawayne Bailey is an American guitarist who has toured and recorded with Bob Seger & the Silver Bullet Band, Véronique Sanson, and Chicago.

Bailey was born and raised in Manhattan, Kansas.  While still attending Manhattan High School in Kansas, he founded the band Rathbone, which developed a strong regional fan base.  In 1972, Bailey and Rathbone moved to Los Angeles to foster their musical career.

Career
Bailey released his first solo recording in 1982, a 45 rpm single of his song "Revenge of the Nurds". The release was suggested by Gerry Fialka, Bailey’s first manager who was also Executive Producer.

Bailey then joined Gerard McMahon's band in summer 1982 and recorded No Looking Back on Full Moon/Warner Bros. which was released in 1983. While playing live shows with McMahon's band, Bailey was requested by Bob Seger's office to fly to Detroit and audition for Seger & The Silver Bullet Band. Bailey joined Seger's band in Feb 1983 and sang backing vocals and played lead guitar on Seger's The Distance tour, recorded Seger's Like a Rock album and performed in several videos.

Bailey then formed his own band called Private Parts and recorded their debut album in 1986 called Dancing The Marmara. It was during this time that Bailey's former bandmate Jason Scheff called him to audition for the lead guitarist spot in Chicago. Bailey toured and recorded with Chicago from July 1986 to January 1995, and was a contributor to their previously unreleased album, which was intended in 1994 to be titled Stone of Sisyphus. He composed the title track for that album - he also shares lead vocals with Robert Lamm and plays all guitars on the title track, as well as composed another track called "Get On This". The latter was not included on the eventual June 2008 Rhino Records release of Chicago XXXII: Stone of Sisyphus for unknown reasons.

After Chicago, Bailey remained in Los Angeles and went on to perform and record with various original projects such as Shayna, Belly Puddle (featuring Jason Scheff's brother Lauren), and Bailey's own Goblin Girl Records releases. Bailey then toured and recorded with French legend Véronique Sanson in 1998 and 1999.

In October 2006, Bailey released the studio album, Joyland, on his Goblin Girl label. He performed nearly all of the instrumentation and vocals, as well as assuming the majority of production duties. He also released Sketch, a compilation of demos, unreleased material, and other miscellaneous tracks.

In March 2007, Bailey was inducted into the Kansas Music Hall of Fame.  In February 2012, Bailey was inducted into the Manhattan High School hall of fame.

Many of Bailey's contributions to Chicago were documented with many of his quotations, in the book The Greatest Music Never Sold, chronicling the development of what became Chicago XXXII: Stone of Sisyphus.  His observations and advice about the general lifestyle of the touring musician is quoted in the book Musician's Survival Guide to Life on the Road.

Discography

Videography

References

External links
 
 Official page on Myspace
 
 Véronique Sanson's official website

Living people
American rock guitarists
American male guitarists
Chicago (band) members
Bob Seger & the Silver Bullet Band members
Guitarists from Kansas
20th-century American composers
21st-century American composers
American performance artists
American male composers
20th-century American guitarists
21st-century American guitarists
20th-century American male musicians
21st-century American male musicians
Year of birth missing (living people)